In 1802, the territory that would later become Argentina was part of the Viceroyalty of the Río de la Plata, part of the Spanish Empire.

Births
 Valentín Alsina, lawyer and politician (d. 1869)

References

 
Years of the 19th century in Argentina